Levi Ward Smith (?-December 1863) was an American politician and minister.

He was the eldest son of Silas O. Smith of Rochester, New York, one of the earliest residents of Monroe County, New York.

He began his college life at Hamilton College, but transferred to Yale College at the beginning of his Junior year. He graduated from Yale in 1839.  After leaving college he studied law, was admitted to the bar in Rochester, and engaged in his chosen profession, also devoting much time to politics as a leader of the Whig party in his neighborhood. He was a member of the State Assembly of New York in 1849 and 1850, and was subsequently, Adjutant-General of the state under Gov. Washington Hunt.

After some time he abandoned his legal and political career to study for the ministry of the Protestant Episcopal Church. Having been admitted to orders, he was made the minister of a church in Albion, New York, where he remained two years. He then resigned his post and visited Europe. On his return he became Rector of St Michael's Church, in Germantown, Pennsylvania. While there, he was appointed a chaplain in the regular army and assigned to the charge of the Military Hospital in Germantown. As his health was impaired by these two-fold engagements, he resigned his rectorship and devoted himself to the hospital until disease completely prostrated him.

He died at Germantown, Pennsylvania in December 1863. His remains were removed to Rochester for interment.

References

1863 deaths
Yale College alumni
Whig Party (United States) politicians
19th-century American politicians
Members of the New York State Assembly
New York (state) lawyers
American Episcopal priests
American chaplains
Religious leaders from Rochester, New York
Hamilton College (New York) alumni
Year of birth missing
Politicians from Rochester, New York